The Manuka State Wayside Park is a state park of  with an arboretum located approximately  west of Naalehu, on the Mamalahoa Highway (Route 11) section of the Hawaii Belt Road, on the island of Hawaii, Hawaii, coordinates 

The name means "blundering" in the Hawaiian Language, and was the name of the ancient land division (ahupaa) that ran from a bay on the southwest side of the island up the slopes of the Mauna Loa volcano.
It now contains 48 species of native Hawaiian plants and more than 130 species of other exotic plants and flowers, and is surrounded by the  Manuka Forest Reserve.

There is also a pit crater on the trail.

Services at the park include restrooms, trash cans, and camping in an open shelter.  No drinking water is available at the park.

See also 
 List of botanical gardens in the United States
 Natural Area Reserves System Hawaii

References

External links
Hawaii State Parks page for Manukā State Wayside Park
Wildernet listing for Manuka State Wayside Park

Protected areas of Hawaii (island)
Arboreta in Hawaii
Botanical gardens in Hawaii
State parks of Hawaii